David Miles (born 1959) is a British economist.

David Miles may also refer to:

 David Miles (radio announcer) (born 1954), British continuity announcer and newsreader
 David Miles (actor) (1871–1915), American actor
Dave Miles, ice hockey player, see 1980 NHL Entry Draft
Dave Miles (strongman), see UK Strength Council

See also

David Myles (disambiguation)